A fritter is a portion of meat, seafood, fruit, vegetables or other ingredients which have been battered or breaded, or just a portion of dough without further ingredients, that is deep-fried. Fritters are prepared in both sweet and savory varieties.

Definition
The 1854 edition of An American Dictionary of the English Language by Noah Webster defines fritter as a transitive verb meaning "to cut meat into small pieces to be fried". Another definition from 1861 is given as "a pancake cont. chopped fruit, poultry, fish; also a small piece of meat fried".

Varieties

Africa 
West African countries have many variations similar to fritters. The most common process includes the blending of peeled black-eyed peas with peppers and spices to leave a thick texture. A Yoruba version, akara, is a popular street snack and side dish in Nigerian culture.

South Africa 
Pumpkin fritters, served with cinnamon sugar at any time of day, are popular in South Africa.

Asia

South Asia 
Fritters are extremely popular roadside snacks all over South Asia and are commonly referred to as pakora (pakoda) or bhajji (bhajia) in local parlance—the onion bhaji also enjoys a high popularity abroad and at home.

India 
In India, a pakora is a fritter of assorted vegetables and spices.

In the South Indian state of Kerala, banana fritters are extremely popular.
 
Peyaji is a Bengali dish of fritters with onions.

Southeast Asia

Brunei 
They are usually made with fillings which are commonly made with banana, shrimp, yam, sweet potatoes and vegetables (usually sliced cabbages or carrots).

Indonesia 
In Indonesia fritters come under the category of gorengan (from goreng "to fry"), and many varieties are sold on travelling carts or by street vendors throughout Indonesia. Various kinds of ingredients are battered and deep-fried, such as bananas (pisang goreng), tempe mendoan, tahu goreng (fried tofu), oncom, sweet potato, cassava chunk, cassava tapai, cireng (tapioca fritters), bakwan (flour with chopped vegetables), Tahu isi (filled tofu), and breadfruit. These are often eaten accompanied by fresh bird's eye chili. The variety known as bakwan commonly contains flour with chopped vegetables such as carrot and cabbage, whereas the fried patties called perkedel typically consist of mashed potatoes or ground corn (perkedel jagung or bakwan jagung).

Malaysia 
In Malaysia, it is common for a type of fritter called "cucur" (such as yam, sweet potato and banana) to be fried by the roadside in a large wok and sold as snacks.

Myanmar 

In Burmese cuisine, fritters are called a-kyaw, while assorted fritters are called a-kyaw-sone. The most popular a-kyaw is the gourd fritter (ဘူးသီးကြော်). Diced onions, chickpea, potatoes, a variety of leafy vegetables, brown bean paste, Burmese tofu, chayote, banana and crackling are other popular fritter ingredients. Black beans are made into a paste with curry leaves to make bayagyaw—small fritters similar to falafel. Unlike pisang goreng, Burmese banana fritters are made only with overripe bananas with no sugar or honey added.

The savory fritters are eaten mainly at breakfast or as a snack at tea. Gourd, chickpea and onion fritters are cut into small parts and eaten with Mohinga, Myanmar's national dish. These fritters are also eaten with Kao hnyin baung rice and with Burmese green sauce—called chin-saw-kar or a-chin-yay. Depending on the fritter hawker, the sauce is made from chili sauce diluted with vinegar, water, cilantro, finely diced tomatoes, garlic and onions.

Philippines 
In the Philippines, egg fritters are called tokneneng (duck) or kwek-kwek (quail), and squid fritters are called kalamares. These, along with shrimp fritters called  okoy, and banana fritters called maruya are also sold in travelling cart or street side vendors.

Thailand

East Asia

China 
Throughout China, fritters are sold at roadsides. They may contain pork, but are commonly vegetarian.

Japan 
In Japanese cuisine, tempura is vegetable or seafood dipped and fried in a light crispy batter and served as a common accompaniment to meals.

Korea 

In Korean cuisine, deep-fries are known as twigim. Twigim are often battered and breaded, but there are varieties without breading, as well as varieties without breading and batter. Popular twigim dishes include dak-twigim (fried chicken), gim-mari-twigim (fried seaweed roll), goguma-twigim (fried sweet potato), gul-twigim (fried oyster), ojingeo-twigim (fried squid), and saeu-twigim (fried shrimp).

Traditional vegetarian deep-fries associated with Korean temple cuisine include twigak and bugak. Twigak are made from vegetables such as dasima (kelp) and bamboo shoot, without breading or batter. Bugak are made from vegetables such as dasima, perilla leaves, and chili peppers, which are coated with glutinous rice paste and dried thoroughly.

Iran 
The Iranian variety is called Kuku which come in different versions like the ones with potatoes or the ones with herbs. This type of fritter resembles a crustless quiche.

New Zealand 
Whitebait fritters are popular in New Zealand.

Europe

United Kingdom 
In British fish and chip shops, the fish and chips can be accompanied by "fritters", which means a food item, such as a slice of potato, a pineapple ring, an apple ring or chunks, or mushy peas fried in batter. Hence: "potato fritter", "pineapple fritter", "apple fritter", "pea fritter", etc. At home and at school, fritters are also sometimes made with meat, especially Spam and corned beef.
A fritter roll or roll and fritter is a potato fritter inside a bread roll, served with salt and vinegar.

North America

Canada/ United States of America
The apple fritter is a common fritter in Canada and the United States. Commonly found in doughnut shops, it is typically made from a yeast dough made of flour, sugar, eggs, milk, butter or shortening, and baker's yeast. The dough is basically the same as a traditional Canadian/American doughnut dough. It is flattened out and rolled with chopped apples and cinnamon. It is then chopped up into small pieces then reformed. It then is cut into portions and left to rise before being deep-fried or fried immediately. After done frying, they are dipped in a vanilla flavored glaze. It is believed to have been created by Tim Hortons in 1964 as one of their two original pastry items along with the dutchie doughnut. There is also a quick bread version that can be found from recipes online. It is mainly in the United States of America and is typically made from flour, sugar, baking powder, chopped apples, cinnamon, milk and eggs. It is also deep-fried and dipped in vanilla glaze as the yeasted version. In 2020, McDonald's  announced that they will be serving apple fritters along with two other pastry items all day.

See also 

 
 
 
 
 
 
 
 
 
 
 
 List of doughnut varieties
 List of bread dishes
 List of deep fried foods

References

External links

Articles containing video clips
Fritters
Street food